Albert Cook Outler (November 17, 1908 – September 1, 1989) was a 20th-century American Methodist historian, theologian, and pastor. He was a professor at Duke University, Yale University, and Southern Methodist University. He was a key figure in the 20th-century ecumenical movement.

Biography 
Outler was born and raised in Georgia and was an ordained Methodist elder who served in several appointments. He graduated from Wofford College and received his Doctor of Philosophy degree from Yale University, teaching at both Yale and Duke University before beginning a long tenure at Southern Methodist University in Texas. He taught courses in Christian history, Christian theology, Christian doctrine, and Wesleyan studies.

He was a delegate to Consultation on Church Union, served on the Faith & Order board of the World Council of Churches and was an official observer  representing the Methodist at the Second Vatican Council. He was a key figure in the 20th-century ecumenical movement.

Theological contribution 
Along with his contemporaries Colin Williams, Frank Baker, and John Deschner, Outler's work on John Wesley became a catalyst for contemporary Wesleyan scholarship.

Outler's contributions to Methodist history and theology include his book John Wesley for "The Library of Protestant Thought" series, the first book that argued for Wesley as an important theologian in the Western tradition, as well as his critical editions of Wesley's Sermons for the Works of John Wesley editorial project.

Outler is widely credited with being the first to recognize John Wesley's method for theologizing, via what Outler referred to as the Wesleyan Quadrilateral: scripture, church tradition, reason, and personal experience. This understanding of Wesleyan theology is prevalent throughout Methodism, particularly in the United Methodist Church. Using this model, Outler was a key figure in organizing the theological statement put forth by the United Methodist Church after its formation in 1968. Some argue that his most original contribution was the introduction of the concept of church "Tradition" into Wesleyan theology.

With his many references to the early church, Outler's work has proven very influential to those in the paleo-orthodox movement and contemporary evangelicalism, notably Thomas C. Oden, like Outler, a United Methodist clergyman.

He also wrote books and articles on patrology, psychotherapy, and theology.  Many of his writings have been collected in the Albert Outler Library series by Bristol House publishers.

Works

Books

Articles

References

Citations

Sources

Further reading
Biographies

External links

1908 births
1989 deaths
20th-century American philosophers
American evangelicals
American United Methodist clergy
Arminian ministers
Arminian theologians
Duke University faculty
History of Methodism in the United States
Methodist philosophers
Methodist theologians
Presidents of the American Society of Church History
Wofford College alumni
Yale University faculty